Vipulananda Central College is a provincial school in Karaitivu, Sri Lanka.

See also
 List of schools in Eastern Province, Sri Lanka

References

Provincial schools in Sri Lanka
Schools in Ampara District